Benjamin C. Baroody is a New Hampshire politician.

Education
Baroody graduated from Manchester Central High School. Baroody later graduated from La Salle Extension University in 1969.

Career
Baroody served in the New Hampshire House of Representatives from 1992 to 2012. On November 4, 2014, Baroody was elected to the New Hampshire House of Representatives where he represents the Hillsborough 43 district. Baroody assumed office on December 3, 2014. Baroody is a Democrat.

Personal life
Baroody resides in Manchester, New Hampshire. Baroody is divorced and has two children.

References

Living people
Manchester Central High School alumni
La Salle Extension University alumni
Politicians from Manchester, New Hampshire
Democratic Party members of the New Hampshire House of Representatives
20th-century American politicians
21st-century American politicians
Year of birth missing (living people)